Thoeng is a district (amphoe) in the eastern part of Chiang Rai province, northern Thailand.

Geography
Neighboring districts are (from the southwest clockwise) Pa Daet, Mueang Chiang Rai, Wiang Chai, Phaya Mengrai, Khun Tan, and Wiang Kaen of Chiang Rai Province. To the east is Bokeo province of Laos, and to the south is Phayao province.

Thoeng is a mountainous district. The conspicuous 1,174 m high Doi Ian rises 12 km to the east and 823 m high Doi Kham rises four km south of the town between Thoeng and Chiang Kham. There are some higher mountains in the east of the district such as 1,013 m high Doi Pha Mon and 1,442 m high Phu Chi Fa at the border with Wiang Kaen District. The Ing River, with its source in the Phi Pan Nam Range (Doi Luang in Mae Chai district, Phayao Province) flows through the plain area of Thoeng. Other rivers in the area are the Lao River, a tributary of the Kok River, from Doi Phu Lang Ka, Chiang Kham district, in the north and Ngao River from Doi Pha Mon and the Plong River.

Administration
The district is divided into 10 subdistricts (tambons), which are further subdivided into 175 villages (mubans). There are two townships (thesaban tambons): Wiang Thoeng covers parts of tambon Wiang, and Ban Plong covers parts of tambon Plong. There are a further 10 sub-district administrative organizations (SAO).

Missing numbers belong to tambons which now form Khun Tan District.

References

External links

amphoe.com (Thai)

Thoeng